Michael Kwame Attah is a Ghanaian politician and was a member of the first parliament of the second Republic of Ghana. He represented the Jaman constituency under the membership of the progress party (PP)

Early life and education 
Attah was born on 16 May 1939. He attended University of Ghana where he obtained a Bachelor of Arts in Sociology. He later become a politician.

Politics 
He began his political career in 1969 when he became the parliamentary candidate for the Progress Party (PP) to represent his constituency in the Parliament of Ghana prior to the commencement of the 1969 Ghanaian parliamentary election.

He was sworn into the First Parliament of the Second Republic of Ghana on 1 October 1969 after being pronounced winner at the 1969 Ghanaian election held on 26 August 1969 and his tenure of office ended on 13 January 1972.

Personal life 
He is a Christian.

References 

Ghanaian MPs 1969–1972
1939 births
University of Ghana alumni
Living people